The Bignou Gallery was a New York City gallery located in Midtown Manhattan. It was a branch of the Bignou Gallery in Paris. The Bignou Gallery exhibited works by major European and American artists including Paul Gauguin, Georges Gimel, Henri Matisse, Jean Lurçat, and Amedeo Modigliani.

Étienne Bignou

Étienne Bignou (1891–1950) was a French art dealer known for his promotion of the Impressionists.

After the French art dealer Georges Petit's death, the Galerie Georges Petit was acquired by Étienne Bignou and the prominent art dealers/brothers Gaston Bernheim-Jeune and Josse Bernheim-Jeune.

External links
Finding aid for the Bignou Gallery Albums, 1930-1940s The Frick Collection/Frick Art Reference Library Archives
Digitized Exhibition catalogs with essays by Bignou Metropolitan Museum of Art  
 Etienne Bignou photograph Archives of American Art 
 View from Bignou Gallery photograph NYPL Digital Gallery

Related
Georges Petit
Jean Lurçat
La Mousmé

References

57th Street (Manhattan)
Defunct art museums and galleries in Manhattan
Frick Collection
Midtown Manhattan